Mićo Janić (born 28 May 1979 in Bačka Palanka, SFR Yugoslavia) is a Serbian and Croatian sprint canoer who competed in the late 1990s. He won a silver medal in the K-2 1000 m event at the 1998 ICF Canoe Sprint World Championships in Szeged.

He is the son of Serbian canoer Milan Janić. His sister is Nataša Janić, a multiple canoe Olympic gold medalist for Hungary. His brother Stjepan is also canoer.

References

Living people
Croatian male canoeists
Serbian male canoeists
1979 births
People from Bačka Palanka
ICF Canoe Sprint World Championships medalists in kayak
Serbian emigrants to Croatia
Mediterranean Games gold medalists for Croatia
Competitors at the 2005 Mediterranean Games
Mediterranean Games medalists in canoeing